Joe Mister Sachs is an American television writer and producer. He has worked extensively on ER in both capacities.

Career

Sachs first became involved with ER as a technical advisor midway through the first season. He had a guest starring role as an Emergency Medical Technician in the first season episode "Motherhood".

Sachs became a writer beginning in the second season. He continued in his role as a technical advisor and writer until the fifth season, when he assumed the additional responsibility of story editor. He became executive story editor and continued to write episodes for the sixth season, finally giving up his technical advisor role. He then joined the production team and became a supervising producer by the eleventh season. He was promoted to co-executive producer for the thirteenth season and finally became an executive producer for the fourteenth season. As of the close of the fourteenth season he has written 29 episodes.

In 1999 Sachs was nominated for a Writers Guild of America Award for his work on the episode "Exodus" along with his co-writer Walon Green. In 2001 ER was nominated for an Emmy Award for it and Sachs shared the nomination with the other producers.

Filmography

Writer

References

External links
 

Living people
American television writers
Place of birth missing (living people)
Year of birth missing (living people)
American male television writers